The 25th Special Mission Forces Division, mostly known by their former name Tiger Forces or Quwwat al-Nimr, is an elite formation (special forces unit) of the Syrian Arab Army under the charge of Alawite commander Suheil al-Hassan. It was formed in late 2013 and functions primarily as an offensive unit in the Syrian Civil War. It has been described as a "hot commodity for any government offensive", but their relatively small numbers make it difficult to deploy them to multiple fronts at once.

History 
The special forces unit was formed during the Syrian civil war.

According to Gregory Waters, the Tiger Forces are operated by the Air Force Intelligence Directorate.p. 2 After successful operations in Latakia and Hama,p. 2 Colonel Suheil al-Hassan was tasked a special project by the Syrian Armed Forces Central Command in the fall of 2013—to train and lead a Special Forces unit that would work primarily as an offensive unit. Colonel Hassan handpicked many of the soldiers that would later form the Tiger Forces. Initially, the unit was formed by recruiting personnel from the 53rd Regiment (part of Special Forces Command) and the 14th Special Forces Division, on the other hand, heavy equipment was supplied by the 4th and 11th Divisions.

On 25 December 2015, Suheil al-Hassan was promoted to major general after refusing to be brigadier general the year before. He played a key role in commanding Syrian troops during the 2016 Aleppo campaign. The Tiger Forces were tasked with cutting the key rebel supply lines to Aleppo city.

In early spring 2015, following Syrian government's loss of the city of Idlib, the unit was reorganised.p. 3 The Tiger Forces were one of few in the Syrian Army to first deploy Russian T-90 tanks, others being the 4th Armoured Division and Desert Hawks Brigade. A Russian-supplied Rys LMV was seen after defeating ISIL in the village of Ayn Al-Hanish in the Dayr Hafir Plains.

The most famous and effective tactic of the Tiger Forces is probing the enemy from multiple axes to find a weak spot, then sending a large mechanized force to that area to capture many villages at once. According to Gregory Waters, they ultimately report to Major General Jamil Hassan, the director of the country's Air Force Intelligence Directorate.

In September/October 2018, reports indicated that between 6,500 and 8,000 Tiger Forces members will be demobilized.

It's reported that the unit works closely with Russian KSSO units, the latter acting as advisors.

Renaming and reorganization 
On 29 August 2019, the Syrian Government reorganized the unit, renaming it from Tiger Forces to 25th Special Mission Forces Division and placing it under the Syrian Army's central command, while keeping Maj. Gen. Suheil al-Hassan as its commanding officer.

In March 2022, the Wagner Group began recruiting ex-members of the 25th Special Mission Forces Division so that they could fight for Russia in the Russo-Ukrainian War.

Organisation 
According to Gregory Waters for the Middle East Institute in October 2018, the Tiger Forces deploy approximately 24 groups (halfway between a company and a battalion), which organise about 4,000 infantry, as well as an attached artillery regiment and an armoured unit.p. 6 Alongside permanent troops, the Tiger Forces make use of affiliated militia, who remain largely garrisoned in their hometowns until called on to join offensives as the need arises.

List of subordinate units in 2018 
Later reports seem to suggest an altered internal structure, stating that the unit consists of the following subunits:
 Termah (or Tarmeh) Group/Regiment: according opposition sources has a strength of about 2,000 troops, recruited from northern Hama.p. 6
 Taha Group, officially "Taha Regiment – Assault." It is an assault unit formed in 2014, and is led by Ali Taha. The unit claimed to have 2,500 active members by mid-2018.
 Yarrob Group/Regiment
 Shaheen Group/Regiment
 Shabaat Group/Regiment
 Al Hawarith Group/Regiment (Navaris Group)
 Zaydar Group/Regiment
 Al Shabbour Group/Regiment
 Al-Komeet Group/Regiment
 Al-Luyouth Group/Regiment (Shadi Group)
 Hayder Group/Regiment
 Raqqa Hawks Brigade (not to be confused with the Syrian Democratic Forces' Raqqa Hawks Brigade)

The Tiger Forces consisted of as many as 24 subgroups of varying size. Tiger Forces groups/subunits were founded by prominent individuals who often also served as commanders of a particular group (the group often bearing the name of the individual who founded and/or commanded the group).

Cheetah Forces 
Cheetah Forces or Qawat al-Fahoud as of October 2018 is the largest sub-unit of the Tiger Forces.p. 8 The Cheetah Forces is subdivided into as many as 14 Company-level units: Cheetah 1 to Cheetah 10, Cheetah 15, Cheetah 16, Cheetah 41 and the 2nd Storming Battalion (Rami Hamadi Group).p. 8 Cheetah 6 were the first soldiers that ended the 35-month long Relieving of Kuweires Military Airbase, while Cheetah 3 along with the Desert Hawks Brigade completed the East Aleppo ISIS encirclement.

The current commander is Brigadier General Ali Ahmed Kna’an al-Hajjip. 11 and the deputy commander is Colonel Lu’ayy Sleitan.

Panther Forces 
Panther Forces – According to Leith Fadel in 2016, the commander was Colonel Ali Shaheen, and they were involved in the Palmyra offensive (March 2016), where they were redeployed to another front after it was over. According to Waters, the "Panther Groups" are actually the Cheetahs, and are not commanded by Ali Shaheen, who instead commands the Leouth Groups.

Armour and artillery units 
The Tiger Forces have a dedicated artillery regiment (led by Lieutenant Colonel Dourid Awad) and an armoured unit; both the artillery and armoured units appear to be distinct entities within the Tiger Forces.p. 6

Both the artillery and armoured units are independent from other groups, reporting directly to the Tiger Forces’ command. The size of the armoured unit is unknown.

Affiliated militia units 
The Tiger Forces regular groups have local defensive units, as well as operational units which deploy across the country.p. 6 According Gregory Waters, the operational units outside standing groups make up one-and-a-half to two brigades.p. 6

See also
 Republican Guard
 Desert Hawks Brigade
 Ba'ath Brigades
 Syrian Marines

References

Bibliography

Further reading
 Al-Souria News Who's Who: Suheil Al-Hassan, Syrian Observer, Nov 25th, 2015
 Sam Dagher Russia's Favorite Syrian Warlord: Brigadier General Suheil al-Hassan has won over Putin and played a central role in the assault on eastern Ghouta, The Atlantic 3 March 2018
 Lucas Winter Suheil al-Hassan and the Syrian Army’s Tiger Forces, Small Wars Journal

Pro-government factions of the Syrian civil war
Military units and formations established in 2013
Special forces of Syria
Divisions of Syria